Jacques Rozier (10 November 1926) is a French film director and screenwriter. He is one of the lesser known members of the French New Wave movement and has collaborated with Jean-Luc Godard. Three of his films have been screened at the Cannes Film Festival. In 1978, he was a member of the jury at the 28th Berlin International Film Festival.

Filmography

Features
 1963 Adieu Philippine
 1973 Du Cote D'Orouet
 1976 The Castaways of Turtle Island
 1985 Maine-Ocean Express (Prix Jean Vigo)
 2001 Fifi Martingale
 2007 The Blue Parrot

Shorts and TV work
 Comment devenir cinéaste sans se prendre la tête (1995)
 Revenez plaisirs exilés! (Alceste) (TV) (1992)
 Joséphine en tournée (TV) (1990)
 Lettre d'un cinéaste: Jacques Rozier (TV: episode of Cinéma cinémas) (1983)
 Lettre de la Sierra Morena (1983)
 Nono Nénesse (1976)
 Jean Vigo (TV: episode of Cinéastes de notre temps) (1964)
 Ni figue ni raisin (TV) (1964)
 Le Parti Des Choses (1963)
 Dans Le Vent [doc] (1962)
 Blue Jeans (1958)
 Rentrée des classes (1956)

Notes

External links
 
 Biography on newwavefilm.com
 cineresources.com archive of articles

1926 births
Living people
French film directors